Abdul Rahman Omar (born 31 August 1945) is a Kenyan former sports shooter. He competed in the 50 metre pistol event at the 1972 Summer Olympics.

References

External links
 

1945 births
Living people
Kenyan male sport shooters
Olympic shooters of Kenya
Shooters at the 1972 Summer Olympics
Place of birth missing (living people)